Scythris bifractella is a moth of the family Scythrididae. It was described by Hans Rebel in 1917. It is found in Sudan.

References

bifractella
Moths described in 1917